Sarısaz is a neighbourhood in the Oltu District of Erzurum Province in Turkey.

References

Villages in Oltu District